Gypsy Love may refer to:

Film and TV
Gypsy Love (1922 film), 1922 Austrian film
Gypsy Love, 1938 Czechoslovakian film containing fictional representations of Romani people

Music
Gipsy Love (operetta), 1910 operetta by Franz Lehár, Alfred Willner, and Robert Bodanzky
"Gypsy Love", song by Jack Savoretti from his album Between the Minds
"Amor Gitano", song by Alejandro Fernández and Beyoncé
"Gypsy Love Song", ('Slumber on, my little gypsy sweetheart') by Herbert and Marx from The Fortune Teller (operetta)